Sheila (alternatively spelled Shelagh and Sheelagh) is a common feminine given name, derived from the Irish name Síle, which is believed to be a Gaelic form of the Latin name Caelia, the feminine form of the Roman clan name Caelius, meaning 'heavenly'.

People
 Sheila (French singer) (born 1945), real name Annie Chancel, French singer of group "Sheila (and) B. Devotion"
 Sheila (German singer) (born 1984), Sheila Jozi, German folk/schlager singer of Iranian descent
 Sheila Bair (born 1954), chairman of the Federal Deposit Insurance Corporation
 Sheila Bleck (born 1974), IFBB bodybuilder
 Sheila Burnett (born 1949), British sprint canoeist
 Sheila Chandra (born 1965), English pop singer
 Sheila Cherfilus-McCormick (born 1979), American politician
 Sheila Chisholm (1895–1969), socialite, probable inspiration for the Australian phrase "a good-looking sheila"
 Sheila Copps (born 1952), Canadian politician, Deputy Prime Minister of Canada, 1993–97
 Sheila Dikshit (1938–2019), Chief Minister of Delhi, India, 1998-2003
 Sheila Dixon (born 1953), former Mayor of Baltimore and criminal
 Sheila E. (born 1957), American singer
 Sheila Ellison, American author on parenting and relationships
 Sheila Elorza (born 1996), Spanish footballer
 Sheila Fearn (born 1940), English actress
 Sheila Florance (1916–1991), Australian actress
 Sheila Gordon (born 1927), South African novelist
 Sheila Graber (born 1940), British animator, artist and Visiting Professor at the University of Sunderland.
 Sheila Greibach (born 1939), American theoretical computer scientist
 Sheila Hancock (born 1933), English actress and author
 Sheila A. Hellstrom (1935–2020), Canadian general
 Sheila Henig (1934–1979), Canadian pianist and soprano
 Sheila Hicks (born 1934), American artist
 Sheila Hoskin (born 1936), English track and field athlete
 Sheila Ingram (1957–2020), American sprinter
 Sheila Jordan (born 1928), American jazz singer and songwriter
 Sheila Kaye-Smith (1887–1956), English writer
 Sheila Miyoshi Jager (born 1963), American anthropologist
 Sheila Oliver (born 1952), American politician
 Sheila M. Riggs, American dentistry scholar
 Sheila Rowan (physicist), British physicist
 Sheila Steafel (1935–2019), South African-born British actress
 Sheila Scribner (born 1984), American singer
 Sheila Taormina (born 1969), American athlete
 Sheila White (actress) (born 1950), English actress
 Sheila White (activist) (born 1988), American abolitionist and human trafficking victim

Fiction 
Sheila Bennet, Bonnie Bennet's grandmother, referred to as Grams by her, a character in The Vampire Diaries
Shelagh Turner, nurse and midwife, a character in Call the Midwife.
Sheila, a character from the Webcomic Satan and Me
Sheila Bryant, a character in the musical A Chorus Line
The tank in Red vs. Blue; see 
A character in Army of Darkness
Sheila Broflovski, a character from the animated series South Park
Sheila Carter, a character from The Young and the Restless and The Bold and the Beautiful
Sheila Corkhill, a character from the defunct British soap opera Brookside
Sheila Franklin, a character and a song in the musical Hair
Sheila Futterman, a character in Gremlins
Sheila Gallagher, a character from the British television series Shameless
Sheila Grant, a character in the British soap opera Brookside
Sheila Tubman, a character in Judy Blume's book series Fudge
Sheila R. Webb, a character in Agatha Christie's novel The Clocks
Sheela na gig, a female character in ancient figurative carvings, used as architectural grotesques on churches, castles and other buildings, particularly in Ireland and Great Britain
Sheila, one of the main characters in the animated television series Dungeons and Dragons
Sheila, a fictional character (a Spanish child singer) from Mis Adorables Vecinos (2004–2006), played by Yaiza Esteve
Sheila, one of the main characters in the anime series Tweeny Witches
Sheila, a fictional character from SheZow
Sheila, a playable kangaroo in the PlayStation  game Spyro: Year of the Dragon
Sheila, a character from item song "Sheila Ki Jawani", portrayed by Katrina Kaif from film Tees Maar Khan
Sheila Birling, a character from J. B. Priestley's play An Inspector Calls

See also
 Shelia
 Scheila
 Shyla

Gaelic-language given names
Irish-language feminine given names